SANM may refer to:
 Storage area network management
 CA Spectrum Alarm Notification Manager